Ramada is a group or massif in Argentina. It's located at Calingasta Department, San Juan Province, at the Cordillera de la Ramada.

Elevation

Based on the elevation provided by the available Digital elevation models, SRTM (6371m), SRTM2 (6375m), ASTER (6360m), SRTM filled with ASTER (6375m), TanDEM-X(6402m), and also a handheld GPS survey by Maximo Kausch on 12/2009 (6380 meters), Ramada seems to be 6384 meters above sea level.

The height of the nearest key col is 5177 meters so its prominence is 1207 meters. Ramada is listed as group or massif, based on the Dominance system  and its dominance is 18.91%. This information was obtained during a research by Suzanne Imber in 2014.

References

External links
Elevation information about Ramada
Weather Forecast at Ramada

See also
List of mountains in the Andes

Six-thousanders of the Andes
Mountains of Argentina